Alexander Bain "Alec" McCue (25 November 1927 – 25 October 1989) was a Scottish professional footballer who played as a winger.

References

1927 births
1989 deaths
Footballers from Greenock
Scottish footballers
Association football wingers
Clydebank Juniors F.C. players
Greenock Morton F.C. players
Falkirk F.C. players
Carlisle United F.C. players
Grimsby Town F.C. players
Shrewsbury Town F.C. players
Hastings United F.C. (1948) players
English Football League players